Conus canonicus, common name the tiger cone, is a species of sea snail, a marine gastropod mollusk in the family Conidae, the cone snails and their allies.

Like all species within the genus Conus, these snails are predatory and venomous. They are capable of "stinging" humans, therefore live ones should be handled carefully or not at all.

Description
The size of the shell varies between 25 mm and 70 mm. The appearance of the shell is closely related to Conus textile, but it has much smaller reticulations, more completely covering the surface.

Distribution
This marine species occurs in the Red Sea, the tropical Indo-West Pacific and off Australia (Northern Territory, Queensland and Western Australia)

References

 Bruguière, M. 1792. Encyclopédie Méthodique ou par ordre de matières. Histoire naturelle des vers. Paris : Panckoucke Vol. 1 i-xviii, 757 pp.
 Dufo, M.H. 1840. Observations sur les Mollusques marins, terrestres et fluviatiles des iles Séchelles et des Amirantes. Annales des Sciences Naturelles, Paris 2 14, Zoologie: 45–80
 Reeve, L.A. 1843. Monograph of the genus Conus. pls 1–39 in Reeve, L.A. (ed.). Conchologica Iconica. London : L. Reeve & Co. Vol. 1. 
  Bonnet, A. 1864. Coquilles nouvelles ou peu connues: Acantina delorioli, Bulimus wairgeirensis, Planorbis sinuosus, Littorina aurea, Trochus millelineata, Conus rubescens. Revue et Magasin de Zoologie Pure et Appliquée 1864, XVI: 279–282
  Sowerby, G.B. 1866. Monograph of the genus Conus. pp. 328–329 in Thesaurus Conchyliorum, or monographs of genera of shells. London : Sowerby, G.B. Vol. 3. 
 Hinton, A. 1972. Shells of New Guinea and the Central Indo-Pacific. Milton : Jacaranda Press xviii 94 pp. 
 Cernohorsky, W.O. 1978. Tropical Pacific marine shells. Sydney : Pacific Publications 352 pp., 68 pls. 
 Drivas, J.; Jay, M. (1987). Coquillages de La Réunion et de l'Île Maurice. Collection Les Beautés de la Nature. Delachaux et Niestlé: Neuchâtel. . 159 pp
 Wilson, B. 1994. Australian Marine Shells. Prosobranch Gastropods. Kallaroo, WA : Odyssey Publishing Vol. 2 370 pp.
 Röckel, D., Korn, W. & Kohn, A.J. 1995. Manual of the Living Conidae. Volume 1: Indo-Pacific Region. Wiesbaden : Hemmen 517 pp.
 Puillandre N., Duda T.F., Meyer C., Olivera B.M. & Bouchet P. (2015). One, four or 100 genera? A new classification of the cone snails. Journal of Molluscan Studies. 81: 1–23

External links
 The Conus Biodiversity website
 Cone Shells – Knights of the Sea
 

canonicus
Gastropods described in 1792